Yerba Buena/Moscone station is an underground Muni Metro light rail station located at 4th Street and Folsom Street in the South of Market (SoMa) district of San Francisco, California. It is named for the adjacent Yerba Buena Gardens and Moscone Convention Center. It opened on November 19, 2022, as part of the Central Subway project.

Service 
Yerba Buena station has only one entrance, located close to but not along the intersection of 4th Street and Folsom Street. Escalators, elevators, and stairs take passengers between the surface and the ticket hall, labeled as a Concourse level by the station. After passing through fare gates, passengers take a second set of elevators, escalators, and stairs down to platform level. The station is designed as an island platform, though the immediately upper level within the station hosts additional balconies.

Artwork 
Of the ten artworks installed for the Central Subway, three are located at Yerba Buena/Moscone station:
A work by Tom Otterness, consisting of 59 bronze sculptures, was canceled in November 2011 after it was publicized that Otterness had previously filmed himself in 1977 shooting a dog for the piece "Shot Dog Film". Three temporary artworks were displayed on the fence around the construction site: Horizons by Kota Ezawa in 2013–14, Ellipsis in the Key of Blue by Randy Colosky in 2014, and Procession, by Jason Jägel in 2017.

References

External links 

SFMTA – Yerba Buena/Moscone Station

Future Muni Metro stations
South of Market, San Francisco
Railway stations in the United States opened in 2022
Railway stations located underground in California